Cleo Simmons (born October 21, 1960) is a former American football tight end in the National Football League (NFL) for the Dallas Cowboys. He played college football at Jackson State University.

Early years
Simmons attended Murphy High School, where he practiced football and basketball. He played as a linebacker and safety.

He accepted a football scholarship from Jackson State University. He was converted into a tight end, playing mainly on special teams in his first years. As a junior, he became a starter. 

As a senior, he led the team with 46 receptions for 712 yards and 7 touchdowns. He finished his college career with 54 receptions for 894 yards and 8 touchdowns.

Professional career

Dallas Cowboys
Simmons was signed as an undrafted free agent by the Dallas Cowboys after the 1983 NFL Draft. He was waived on August 29. He was recalled off waivers on August 30, making the team's roster over fourth round draft choice Chris Faulkner. As a rookie, he was the third-string tight end. He was released on August 14, 1984.

Indianapolis Colts
On March 20, 1985, he was signed as a free agent by the Indianapolis Colts. He was cut on August 19.

References

1960 births
Living people
Sportspeople from Mobile, Alabama
Players of American football from Alabama
American football tight ends
Jackson State Tigers football players
Dallas Cowboys players